The Central Science and Technology Commission (CSTC) is a commission of the Chinese Communist Party (CCP) in the process of establishment that will supervise the science and technology sector in China.

History 
The CSTC was established in 2023 under CCP general secretary Xi Jinping after wide-ranging reforms to change the Party and state structure. The commission will strengthen CCP control over the science and technology sector, as well as spearhead China's attempts at developing new technologies. The office of the commission will be located at the newly reorganized Ministry of Science and Technology.

References 

Institutions of the Central Committee of the Chinese Communist Party
2023 establishments in China